Navalli is a village in Dharwad district of Karnataka, India.

Demographics 
As of the 2011 Census of India there were 472 households in Navalli and a total population of 2,225 consisting of 1,131 males and 1,094 females. There were 228 children ages 0-6.

References

Villages in Dharwad district